Francis E. Santos is a Guamanian businessman, educator and former politician who currently works as the vice-chairman and chair of Finance Committee of Consolidated Commission on Utilities since 2019. A member of the Democratic Party, where he served as a senator in the 22nd, 23rd, and 24th Guam Legislatures. He ran unsuccessfully for the Republican nomination for Lieutenant Governor of Guam in 2006.

Early life and family
Francis E. Santos is the son of the late Guam senator Francisco R. Santos.
Santos graduated from Father Duenas Memorial School in 1975. Santos earned a BS in Business Management from Seattle University and an MBA from Loma Linda University.

Guam Legislature

Elections
Santos was elected in a special election held on October 3, 1993, to fill the seat of his father, Francisco R. Santos, who died. He served the remaining term of the 22nd Guam Legislature and was reelected to the 23rd and 24th Guam Legislatures.

Moylan-Santos campaign (2006)
Santos was the running mate of Republican Gubernatorial candidate Lieutenant Governor Kaleo Moylan for the 2006 gubernatorial election. The Moylan-Santos team faced the incumbent governor Felix Perez Camacho and Senator Dr. Michael Cruz. The Moylan-Santos team lost in the primary election on September 2, 2006.

Career after the Guam Legislature
Santos was the former plan administrator of the StayWell Health Plan. Santos was president and CEO of the Island Home Insurance Company.

Santos was the chief financial officer of the Guam Regional Medical City from 2015 to 2016 and currently serves as the senior vice-president of strategic planning and business development for the Guam Regional Medical City. Santos is chairman of the board at the iLearn Academy Charter School. Santos is chairman of the board and member/director of Global Health Systems.

Election to the Consolidated Commission on Utilities
Santos was elected to the Consolidated Commission on Utilities in 2018 Guam General Election. Santos was sworn in on January 10, 2019.

Electoral history

References

20th-century American politicians
21st-century American politicians
Chamorro people
Guamanian Democrats
Living people
Members of the Legislature of Guam
Year of birth missing (living people)